Perth Amboy Terra Cotta Company of Perth Amboy, New Jersey, was a late-nineteenth- and early twentieth-century brickworks, known for the manufacture of many prominent and unique architectural terracotta elements.

The company was famous for the initial manufacture of Tiffany bricks, a speckled light-colored long thin Roman brick. Largely designed by architect Stanford White, they were popularly known as “Tiffany bricks” for their prominent use at Tiffany House (Manhattan) (built 1882–1885, demolished after 1936), on the northwest corner of E72nd Street and Madison Avenue. Perth Amboy was a town familiar with White's partner, Charles Follen McKim, who had gone to school there. White used the manufactured bricks of the firm throughout the 1880s. The popularity of this and other bricks led to other architects commissioning specialized bricks for projects here and in other New Jersey brickworks.

See also
 Atlantic Terra Cotta Company

References

External links
 Catalogue and price list, 1885: Perth Amboy Terra-Cotta Co. at the Internet Archive

Perth Amboy, New Jersey

Companies established in 1846
1846 establishments in New Jersey

Companies based in Middlesex County, New Jersey

Defunct companies based in New Jersey
Building materials companies of the United States
Terracotta
Ceramics manufacturers of the United States